Lunokhod 2 ( ("Moonwalker 2"), also known as Аппарат 8ЕЛ № 204 ("Device 8EL No. 204")) was the second of two unmanned lunar rovers that landed on the Moon by the Soviet Union as part of the Lunokhod programme.

The Luna 21 spacecraft landed on the Moon and deployed the second Soviet lunar rover, Lunokhod 2, in January 1973.   The primary objectives of the mission were to collect images of the lunar surface, examine ambient light levels to determine the feasibility of astronomical observations from the Moon, perform laser ranging experiments from Earth, observe solar X-rays, measure local magnetic fields, and study the soil mechanics of the lunar surface material.

Lunokhod 2 rover and subsystems 

Lunokhod 2 was equipped with three television cameras, one mounted high on the rover for navigation, which could return high resolution images at different frame rates—3.2, 5.7, 10.9 or 21.1 seconds per frame. These images were used by a five-man team of controllers on Earth who sent driving commands to the rover in real time. Power was supplied by a solar panel on the inside of a round hinged lid which covered the instrument bay, which would charge the batteries when opened. A polonium-210 radioisotope heater unit was used to keep the rover warm during the long lunar nights. There were four panoramic cameras mounted on the rover. Scientific instruments included a soil mechanics tester, solar X-ray experiment, an astrophotometer to measure visible and ultraviolet light levels, a magnetometer deployed in front of the rover on the end of a 2.5 m (8 ft 2 in) boom, a radiometer, a photodetector (Rubin-1) for laser detection experiments, and a French-supplied laser corner reflector. The lander carried a bas relief of Vladimir Lenin and the State Emblem of the Soviet Union. The lander and rover together massed 1814 kg.

Mission 
The Proton-K/D launcher put the spacecraft into Earth parking orbit followed by translunar injection. On January 12, 1973 Luna 21 was braked into a  lunar orbit. On January 13 and 14, the perilune was lowered to  altitude.

Landing and surface operations 
On January 15, 1973, after 40 orbits, the descent of the craft was commenced as the braking rocket was fired at  altitude, and the craft began to de-orbit. Landing occurred at 23:35 UT in Le Monnier crater at 25.85 degrees N, 30.45 degrees E.

After landing, the Lunokhod 2 took TV images of the surrounding area, then rolled down a ramp to the surface at 01:14 UT on January 16 and took pictures of the Luna 21 lander and landing site, driving for 30 metres. After a period of charging up its batteries, it took more pictures of the site and the lander, and then set off to explore the moon.

The rover would run during the lunar day, stopping occasionally to recharge its batteries with the solar panels. At night the rover hibernated until the next sunrise, heated by the radioactive source.

 January 18, 1973 to January 24, 1973: The rover drives 1,260 metres
 February 8 to 23: The rover drives 9,086 metres further
 March 11 to 23: The rover drives 16,533 metres further
 April 9 to 22: The rover drives 8,600 metres further
 May 8 to June 3: The rover drives 880 metres further

End of mission 
On June 4, 1973 it was announced that the program was completed, leading to speculation that the vehicle probably failed in mid-May or could not be revived after the lunar night of May–June.

More recently, Alexander Basilevsky related an account in which on May 9, the rover's open lid touched a crater wall and became covered with dust. When the lid was closed, this dust (a very good insulator) was dumped on to the radiators. The following day, May 10, controllers saw the internal temperature of Lunokhod 2 climb as it was unable to cool itself, eventually rendering the rover inoperable. On May 11, signal from the rover was lost.

Results 

Lunokhod 2 operated for about four months, and the original estimate was that it covered  of terrain, including hilly upland areas and rilles, and sent back 86 panoramic images and over 80,000 TV pictures. Many mechanical tests of the surface, laser ranging measurements, and other experiments were completed during this time. Lunokhod 2 was thought to have covered  based on wheel rotations but Russian scientists at the Moscow State University of Geodesy and Cartography (MIIGAiK) revised that to an estimated distance of about  based on Lunar Reconnaissance Orbiter (LRO) images of the lunar surface.

Current status 

Lunokhod 2 continues to be detected by lunar laser ranging experiments and its position is known to sub-meter accuracy.  On March 17, 2010 Phil Stooke at the University of Western Ontario announced that he had located Lunokhod 2 in NASA Lunar Reconnaissance Orbiter (LRO) images, but later images showed the initial identification was incorrect (the identified point was a mark in the rover tracks near the end of the route, made as Lunokhod 2 turned around), and the LRO LROC team identified the correct location of the rover in March 2012. Excellent Lunokhod 2 images from LROC were published by Mark Robinson on SESE site of ASU.

Present ownership 
Ownership of Lunokhod 2 and the Luna 21 lander was sold by the Lavochkin Association for $68,500 in December 1993 at a Sotheby's auction in New York. (The catalog incorrectly lists lot 68A as Luna 17/Lunokhod 1).

The buyer was computer gaming entrepreneur and space tourist Richard Garriott (son of the astronaut Owen K. Garriott), who stated in a 2001 interview with Computer Games Magazine'''s Cindy Yans that:

I purchased Lunakod 21  from the Russians. I am now the world's only private owner of an object on a foreign celestial body. Though there are international treaties that say, no government shall lay claim to geography off planet earth, I am not a government. Summarily, I claim the moon in the name of Lord British!

Garriott later confirmed that he is the owner of Lunokhod 2.The Astronaut's Son's Secret Sputnik. CollectSPACE. October 2007

 See also 

 Exploration of the Moon
 Lunar rover
 Lunokhod 1 Rover (space exploration)
 Timeline of artificial satellites and space probes
 List of artificial objects on the Moon

 References 

 External links 

 Zarya – Lunokhod 2 chronology
 Don P. Mitchell's catalog of Soviet Moon Images including many from Lunokhod 2 Lunokhod 2 information and VRML models at the Virtual Space Museum
 Lunokhod 2 panoramic images
 Lunokhod 2 in space museum – 360 degree panoramic image
 Lunokhod 2 traverse overview, Lunokhod 2''s path in southern Le Monnier crater

2
1973 in the Soviet Union
Missions to the Moon
Lunar rovers
1973 robots
Robots of the Soviet Union
Eight-wheeled robots
Solar-powered robots
Attached spacecraft
Spacecraft launched in 1973
1973 on the Moon